The following is a list of the 32 communes of the Guadeloupe overseas department of France.

The communes cooperate in the following intercommunalities (as of 2020):
Communauté d'agglomération CAP Excellence
Communauté d'agglomération Grand Sud Caraïbe
Communauté d'agglomération du Nord Basse-Terre
Communauté d'agglomération du Nord Grande-Terre
Communauté d'agglomération La Riviéra du Levant
Communauté de communes de Marie-Galante

Former communes detached from Guadeloupe on 22 February 2007:

References

 
Guadeloupe
Guadeloupe 3